The Democratic Union of Alto Adige was an Italian-speaking Christian-democratic political party active in South Tyrol, Italy. Its long-time leader was Luigi Cigolla. The party had a counterpart in Trentino, the Autonomist People's Union.

The party emerged in 1993 as a local split from Christian Democracy and garnered 1.7% of the vote in that year's provincial election.

In the 2003 provincial election the party formed an alliance with Democracy is Freedom – The Daisy and the Union of Christian and Centre Democrats named Autonomist Union. The coalition won 3.7% and Cigolla, re-elected to the Provincial Council for the third time in a row, was appointed provincial minister.

In 2008 the party was merged with the provincial section of Italy of Values, which obtained a mere 1.6% in the provincial election, leaving Cigolla without his seat.

References

Defunct political parties in South Tyrol
Christian democratic parties in Italy
Catholic political parties